The 38th Golden Globe Awards, honoring the best in film and television for 1980, were held on January 31, 1981.

Winners and nominees

Film 

The following films received multiple nominations:

The following films received multiple wins:

Television

The following programs received multiple nominations:

The following programs received multiple wins:

Cecil B. DeMille Award 
Gene Kelly

See also
53rd Academy Awards
1st Golden Raspberry Awards
32nd Primetime Emmy Awards
33rd Primetime Emmy Awards
 34th British Academy Film Awards
 35th Tony Awards
 1980 in film
 1980 in American television

References
IMdb 1981 Golden Globe Awards

038
1980 film awards
1980 television awards
January 1981 events in the United States
Golden Globe